Bhushan Chauhan (born 29 October 1984) is an Indian first-class cricketer who plays for Saurashtra.

References

External links
 

1984 births
Living people
Indian cricketers
Saurashtra cricketers
Place of birth missing (living people)